The Iglesia de la Recoleta is a Catholic church in Cuzco, Peru.

Since 1972 the property is part of the Monumental Zone of Cuzco, which was declared a Historical Monument of Peru. Likewise, in 1983, being part of the historic centre of the city, it is part of the central area declared by UNESCO as a World Heritage Site.

History
Construction began on the church in 1559, founded by Father Francisco de Velasco at the expense of the neighbor Toribio de Bustamante. The church was completed in 1601. Next to the church a convent was built consisting of a small cloister, high and low, with a brick archway on stone columns where the religious lived.

The  seriously affected the temple. For this reason, on February 3, 1688, Nicolás Huallpa, a native of Oropesa, hired  to make 360 ashlars for the reconstruction of the temple tower. By contrast, the  caused little damage to the building.

References

Bibliography

Roman Catholic churches in Cusco
Buildings and structures completed in 1601